Kristiaan Yeo is a television journalist currently employed by CCTV News for CCTV America, as the network's Toronto correspondent.

He is the first and only English-language resident correspondent to cover Canada for Chinese state television.

Career
In 2013, Kristiaan reported from the polar bear capital of the world, Churchill, Manitoba for a series on climate change  and in 2012 reported from Tahrir Square during the Egyptian presidential election, 2012

Prior to joining CCTV News, Kristiaan was part of the on-air team during the 2012 Summer Olympics for BBC London. He was the station's newsreader during Danny Baker's notorious final show.

On May 2, 2011, Kristiaan broke the news of Osama Bin Laden's death on Sky News Radio in a special bulletin syndicated to 280 stations around the world.

While at Sky News, Kristiaan covered the Pride of Britain Awards, interviewing the leader of the Labour Party, Ed Miliband, broadcaster Piers Morgan, actor Warwick Davis, boxer Amir Khan and singer Cheryl Cole. He was the first reporter to interview Westlife for Sky News following their split and produced the channel's 84th Academy Awards nomination coverage.

Kristiaan has also been a regular voice on Classic FM, LBC 97.3 & LBC News 1152, Magic 105.4.

References

Living people
Year of birth missing (living people)